Agyneta gagnei is a species of sheet weaver found in Hawaii. It was described by Gertsch in 1973.

References

gagnei
Spiders of Hawaii
Spiders described in 1973